Prsi or PRSI may refer to:
 Prší, a card game
 Independent Socialist Republican Party
 Pay Related Social Insurance, in Ireland
 Public Relations Society of India, in India, Jaipur Chapter
 Pasadena Refining System